Hyperolius major is a species of frog in the family Hyperoliidae.
It is found in Democratic Republic of the Congo, Zambia, and possibly Angola.
Its natural habitats are subtropical or tropical dry forests, moist savanna, rivers, and swamps.

References

major
Amphibians described in 1957
Taxonomy articles created by Polbot